Kévin Bonnefoi (born 3 December 1991) is a French handballer for Montpellier Handball and the French national team.

References

External links
 Kévin Bonnefoi at European Handball Federation
 Kévin Bonnefoi at Ligue nationale de handball

1991 births
Living people
French male handball players
Montpellier Handball players